The 11th Annual Interactive Achievement Awards is the 11th edition of the Interactive Achievement Awards, an annual awards event that honors the best games in the video game industry. It was also held as part of the Academy's 2008 D.I.C.E. Summit, and was hosted by Jay Mohr.

Call of Duty 4: Modern Warfare was named the winner for Overall Game of the Year, and was tied with BioShock and The Orange Box for winning the most awards. BioShock received the most nominations. Sony Computer Entertainment published the most nominees, while Electronic Arts published the most award winners.

Michael Morhaime, co-founder of Blizzard Entertainment, received the of the Academy of Interactive Arts & Sciences Hall of Fame Award. Ken Kutaragi founder of Sony Computer Entertainment, and the "Father of the PlayStation", received the Lifetime Achievement Award.

Winners and Nominees
Winners are listed first, highlighted in boldface, and indicated with a double dagger.

Special Awards

Hall of Fame
 Michael Morhaime

Lifetime Achievement
 Ken Kutaragi

Games with multiple nominations and awards

The following 25 games received multiple nominations:

The following six games received multiple awards:

Companies with multiple nominations

Companies that received multiple nominations as either a developer or a publisher.

Companies that received multiple awards as either a developer or a publisher.

External links

Notes

References

2008 awards
2008 awards in the United States
February 2008 events in the United States
2007 in video gaming
D.I.C.E. Award ceremonies